The 1967–68 Scottish League Cup was the twenty-second season of Scotland's second football knockout competition. The competition was won for the third successive season by Celtic, who defeated Dundee in the Final.

First round

Group 1

Group 2

Group 3

Group 4

Group 5

Group 6

Group 7

Group 8

Group 9

Supplementary Round

First Leg

Second Leg

Quarter-finals

First Leg

Second Leg

Semi-finals

Ties

Final

References

General

Specific

1967-68 in Scottish football
1967-68